Opistophalmus glabrifrons (commonly known as the shiny burrow scorpion or the yellow-legged burrowing scorpion) is a large (adult size: 11–15 cm) species of burrowing scorpion found in Southern and Eastern Africa.

References

Scorpions of Africa
Scorpionidae
Animals described in 1861
Taxa named by Wilhelm Peters